The Testament of Solomon is an album composed by John Zorn and performed by the Gnostic Trio (Bill Frisell, Carol Emanuel and Kenny Wollesen). It was recorded in New York City in March 2014 and released on the Tzadik label. The album is the fourth by the trio following 2012's The Gnostic Preludes and 2013's The Mysteries and In Lambeth.

Reception
In JazzTimes Bill Beuttler wrote  "The music for this, the fourth Gnostic Trio recording, was originally an instrumental prelude to Zorn’s vocal work Shir Hashirim and leaves more room for improvisation than those preceding it. ...he’s staked another claim to his great range as a composer with this very lovely album."

Track listing
All compositions by John Zorn
 "Alamot" – 4:20
 "Kotlenu" – 4:45
 "Holat Ahavah" – 4:24
 "'Ayummah" – 4:32
 "Nirdi" – 3:15
 "Asis" – 4:31
 "'Atarah" – 4:47
 "Tappuha" – 3:35
 "Berotim" – 4:45
 "Otyah" – 5:10
 "Sammatek" – 4:27

Personnel
Carol Emanuel – harp
Bill Frisell – guitar 
Kenny Wollesen – vibraphone

Production
Marc Urselli – engineer, audio mixer
John Zorn and Kazunori Sugiyama – producers

References

2014 albums
John Zorn albums
Albums produced by John Zorn
Tzadik Records albums